"Summer Madness" is an instrumental tune that was released in 1974 by Kool & the Gang on their album Light of Worlds. It reached number 35 on the Billboard Hot 100 and number 36 on the Hot Soul Singles charts. It has subsequently become one of the most sampled R&B compositions of all time. In the early summer of 1996, Epic Records, a division of Sony Music, reissued and re-released the song as a CD and cassette single.  As of 2018, over 145 recordings had sampled it.

Uses
"Summer Madness" has been used in various media:

It appears in the 1976 film Rocky.
 It was featured in most season 1 episodes of the 1996-2004 Nickelodeon animated television series Hey Arnold!, created by Craig Bartlett, with additional music by Jim Lang.
 It is prominently sampled in the Grammy-winning 1991 single "Summertime" by American hip hop duo DJ Jazzy Jeff & the Fresh Prince from their fourth studio album, Homebase.
The track was sampled in the 1996 song "A Girl Like You", as performed by Aaliyah and Treach, from the former's sophomore album One in a Million.
 It appears in the 2002 video game Grand Theft Auto: Vice City, on the in-game radio station Fever 105. It also appears on the Fever 105 soundtrack CD, in addition to the game's first trailer. 
 It is sampled in the song "Summer 2020" by American R&B singer Jhene Aiko, on the deluxe version of Chilombo.
 It appears in the first season second episode "Hooper" of the 2021 Netflix series Last Chance U: Basketball.

References

1975 singles
1974 songs
1996 songs
Jazz-funk songs
Kool & the Gang songs
Epic Records singles
De-Lite Records singles